Greensea Island is a 1922 adventure novel by the British writer Victor Bridges. It was his final novel for publishers Mills & Boon as he was signed up by Hodder & Stoughton who hoped he could replicate the success of Edgar Wallace's thrillers.

Adaptation
In 1923 it was made into a silent film Through Fire and Water produced by the British studio Ideal Films. Directed by Thomas Bentley it starred Clive Brook, Flora le Breton and Lawford Davidson.

References

Bibliography
 Goble, Alan. The Complete Index to Literary Sources in Film. Walter de Gruyter, 1999.
 McAleer, Joseph. Passion's Fortune: The Story of Mills & Boon. OUP Oxford, 1999.
 Reilly, John M. Twentieth Century Crime & Mystery Writers. Springer, 2015.

1922 British novels
British adventure novels
British romance novels
Novels set in Essex
British novels adapted into films
Novels by Victor Bridges
Mills & Boon books